I'm Cold is a 1954 Chilly Willy cartoon directed by Tex Avery and produced by Walter Lantz. It was the first Chilly Willy cartoon directed by Avery. Chilly Willy also got a major redesign by Avery. This cartoon features the debut of Smedley Dog (voiced by Daws Butler in his "Huckleberry Hound" voice), who would appear in later Chilly Willy Shorts.

Summary
Chilly is freezing at his igloo home and burns everything (one log and pages of a book) in his fireplace until he pulls off an ad for a fur factory guarded by Smedley and realizes that warmth is only a visit away.

See also
The Legend of Rockabye Point (1955)
Tex Avery

References

External links
 
 
 Video

1954 animated films
Walter Lantz Productions shorts
Films directed by Tex Avery
1950s American animated films
Animated films about penguins
1950s English-language films
1954 short films
Universal Pictures animated short films
Animated films about animals
American animated short films
Universal Pictures short films